The District Court of Minnesota is the state trial court of general jurisdiction in the U.S. state of Minnesota.

Jurisdiction of the court
The Minnesota Constitution provides that the district court has original jurisdiction in civil and criminal cases and such appellate jurisdiction as may be prescribed by law. Appeals from these courts usually go to the Minnesota Court of Appeals.

Structure of the court

It is common to refer to the "district courts" in the plural, as if each court in each judicial district is a separate court; this is the usage found in Chapter 484 of the Minnesota Statutes, which governs the jurisdiction, powers, procedure, organization, and operations of the district court.  However, the Minnesota Constitution only refers to the "district court" in the singular (as a single statewide court).  As the Court of Appeals has recognized, "Minnesota trial benches were consolidated into a single district court."

In 2019 there were 289 judges of the district court in Minnesota.  They are assigned to geographic districts.  Each district has three or more judges, who are elected by the voters of the district in nonpartisan judicial elections to six-year terms. Candidates file for a specific judgeship by seat number. Vacancies are filled by appointment of the governor. The chief judge and assistant chief judge of each district are elected from judges of that district to exercise general administrative authority over the courts of the district.  The chief justice of the Minnesota Supreme Court has the power to assign judges from one district to serve in another. 

There are ten judicial districts, each comprising one or more of Minnesota's 87 counties:

References

External links
Minnesota District Courts - Minnesota Judicial Branch

Minnesota state courts
1858 establishments in Minnesota
Courts and tribunals established in 1858